Bjørn Helge Semundseth Riise (born 21 June 1983) is a Norwegian former professional footballer. Riise played either a central midfielder or a right winger, and has earned 35 international caps for Norway. He played for Fulham of the Premier League from July 2009 to August 2012. He is the younger brother of former Liverpool and Fulham player John Arne Riise, also a Norwegian international.

Club career

Aalesund
Early in his career, Riise was linked with several clubs, including Manchester City and Cardiff City, but deals failed to materialize. Riise threatened to retire after the Cardiff deal fell through due to complications with Aalesund, his club at the time, stating "I don't understand what Aalesund want from me. I almost want to quit football because it's not fun anymore".

Standard Liège
In January 2003, Riise signed a three-year deal with Standard Liège, after impressing on a trial that included two reserve team appearances. He became teammates with fellow Norwegian Ole Martin Årst.

Brussels
After playing only 17 matches for Standard Liège, he was loaned out to Brussels. When his contract expired, Brussels would have a call option on him. However, there were transfer talks between Brussels and Brann, according to Belgian newspaper Het Nieuwsblad.

Lillestrøm
Riise returned to Norway with Lillestrøm in the summer of 2005, where he signed a three-and-a-half-year deal. He made his debut for Lillestrøm on 3 July against Molde.

Fulham

In July 2009, Norwegian media reported that Riise was to join international teammates Brede Hangeland and Erik Nevland at Fulham, for a fee believed to be around £2 million. Riise subsequently signed a three-year deal with for an undisclosed fee.

He made his Fulham début in a Europa League tie against FK Vetra coming on as a 78th-minute substitute for Zoltan Gera. Fulham won the match 3–0, winning the tie 6–0 on aggregate. He played regularly throughout the season under Roy Hodgson, especially in the Europa League.

His contract at Fulham was not extended in the summer of 2012, and was free to leave the club. Riise left during May/June.

On loan to Sheffield United
The following season however he found first team football much harder to come by under new boss Mark Hughes and by February 2011 he opted to move on loan to Sheffield United for the remainder of the season. Whilst at Bramall Lane he scored his first goal in English football, in a 2–0 win over Leeds United. With the Blades struggling he could not help to prevent them from being relegated at the end of the season and returned to Craven Cottage having played thirteen times for the Yorkshire club.

Loan to Portsmouth
Riise joined Portsmouth on a short-term loan on 26 September 2011.

Return to Lillestrøm
On 28 July 2012, Riise was presented as a new Lillestrøm player during half time in their home game with Molde.

Return to Aalesund
After three years at Lillestrøm he signed a contract for Aalesund, the club of his hometown and where he started his career.

Sogndal
On 16 August he signed for Norwegian club Sogndal Fotball only one day after his contract in Aalesund expired.

Riise retired after the 2018 season.

International career
He earned his first cap for Norway in a Euro 2008 qualifying match against Malta which Norway won 4–0. He provided three assists in the game which saw his brother John Arne Riise score a goal. Riise earned his first goal for Norway in another qualifying match against Bosnia and Herzegovina. Norway won 2–0, with Riise scoring the second goal of the game.

Personal life
Riise is married to long-term partner, Lena Jenssen – like his brother, he married in the summer of 2010. The couple have three sons, Noah, Filip and Levi.

Career statistics

Club

International goal
Scores and results list. Norway's goal tally first.

Honours
Fulham
UEFA Europa League runner-up: 2009–10

Individual
Eliteserien Top assist provider: 2014

References

External links

1983 births
Living people
Sportspeople from Ålesund
Norwegian footballers
Norway under-21 international footballers
Norway international footballers
Association football midfielders
Aalesunds FK players
Viking FK players
Standard Liège players
R.W.D.M. Brussels F.C. players
Lillestrøm SK players
Fulham F.C. players
Sheffield United F.C. players
Portsmouth F.C. players
Norwegian expatriate footballers
Expatriate footballers in Belgium
Norwegian expatriate sportspeople in Belgium
Expatriate footballers in England
Norwegian expatriate sportspeople in England
Eliteserien players
Norwegian First Division players
Belgian Pro League players
Premier League players
English Football League players